Brian Briggs (1932–1996) was an English rugby league footballer.

Brian or Bryan Briggs may also refer to:

Brian Briggs (musician), English musician
Brian Briggs, founder of BBspot
Bryan Briggs, musician in Tip the Van